List of Guggenheim Fellowships awarded in 1977

William W. Murdoch, population ecologist
Michel Riffaterre, French-born literary scholar (also awarded a Fellowship in 1961)

References

External links 
Guggenheim Fellows for 1977

1977
1977 awards